The 2018–19 MPBL Datu Cup was the second tournament of the Maharlika Pilipinas Basketball League and the first full season with a national scope.

This season featured 26 teams, a big increase from 10 teams in its inaugural season. This led to the addition of the Northern and Southern Divisions into the league.

The ten-month long season opened on June 12, 2018, which coincided with the Philippine Independence Day at the Smart Araneta Coliseum, Quezon City and ended with the final game of the MPBL Finals on April 25, 2019, where San Juan Knights prevailed over the Davao Occidental Tigers, 3 games to 2.

Format 
The format for the cup was:

 All 26 teams are divided into two divisions of 13 teams: the Northern and Southern Divisions, which consist of 13 teams each.
 In the regular season, teams will play in a single round-robin format, with each team playing 25 games, playing each team once. Games are played in a team's homecourt, but not all games feature the home team, technically making them neutral site games.
 At the end of the regular season, all teams are ranked by their win-loss records. The top eight teams in each division advance to the playoffs.
 The first three rounds of the playoffs will be a best-of-three series, while the MPBL Finals will be a best-of-five series.
 Unlike most sports, homecourt advantage in the playoffs works differently in the MPBL:
 In the First Round, the first- and second-seeded teams host all game 1s in its own division, while the third- and fourth-seeded teams host all game 2s in its own division. Any game 3s will be hosted by the first- or second-seeded teams.
 In the Semifinals, the highest-seeded team hosts all game 1s in its own division, while the second highest-seeded team hosts all game 2s in its own division. Any game 3s will be hosted by the highest-seeded team that hasn't advanced yet.
 In the Divisional Finals and National Finals, a traditional homecourt advantage system is used. A 1-1-1 format is used for the Divisional Finals, while a 2-2-1 format is used for the National Finals.
 The winning team from each playoff series advances to the next round until one team from each division remains, where the champion is decided in the MPBL Finals.

Transactions

Coaching changes

Team changes

New teams
Sixteen (16) new teams joined for this cup:

 Bacoor Strikers
 Basilan Steel
 Cebu City Sharks
 Davao Occidental Tigers
 General Santos Warriors
 Laguna Heroes
 Makati Skyscrapers
 Mandaluyong El Tigre
 Manila Stars
 Marikina Shoemasters
 Pampanga Lanterns
 Pasig Pirates
 Pasay Voyagers
 Rizal Crusaders
 San Juan Knights
 Zamboanga Valientes

Name changes
 The Bataan Defenders changed their team name to Bataan Risers before the start of the season.
 The Valenzuela Classics changed their team name to Valenzuela Idol Cheesedogs in July 2018.
 The Makati Skyscrapers changed their team name to Makati Super Crunch in November 2018.
 The Valenzuela Idol Cheesedogs reverted to their original team name, the Valenzuela Classic in November 2018.

Regular season

Northern Division

Southern Division

Results

Not all games are in home–away format. Each team plays every team once. Number of asterisks after each score denotes number of overtimes played.

Playoffs 

Teams in bold advanced to the next round. The numbers to the left of each team indicate the team's seeding in its division, and the numbers to the right indicate the number of games the team won in that round. Teams with home court advantage, the higher seeded team, are shown in italics and are marked in asterisks.

Division 1st Round
The first round is a best-of-three series, with the higher seeded team hosting Game 1, and 3, if necessary.

North Division

|}

South Division

|}

Division 2nd Round

North Division

|}

South Division

|}

Division Finals

North Division Finals

|}

South Division Finals

|}

MPBL Finals
The Davao Occidental Tigers held the homecourt advantage for the title series, as they have defeated the San Juan Knights in their regular-season matchup. But San Juan Knights eventually won the championship in 5 games.

|}

Awards

Statistics

Individual statistic leaders

Individual game highs

Team statistic leaders

MPBL All Star Game
 On March 2, 2019, the league held its first ever MPBL All-Star Game at the Mall of Asia Arena where the Southern All-Stars prevailed over the Northern All-Stars, 109–84. Jeff Viernes of the Batangas City Athletics was named as the first ever MPBL All-Star Game MVP.

Game

 MPBL All-star MVP: Jeff Viernes 
 Slam Dunk Contest Champion: David Carlos 
 3-point Shootout Champion: Gary David

Awards 
The individual league awards was given before the Game 4 of the 2019 MPBL Datu Cup National Finals at the Filoil Flying V Centre in San Juan.

References

2019 MPBL season
2018–19 in Philippine basketball leagues